Carol Patricia Smillie (born 23 December 1961) is a Scottish television presenter, actress and former model. Smillie became famous as a presenter on British TV during the 1990s and early 2000s. She was best known for assisting Nicky Campbell on the UK version of the game show Wheel of Fortune between 1989 and 1994.  Between 1996 and 2003, she was the main presenter on the BBC One home makeover show Changing Rooms.

After leaving the Glasgow School of Art, Smillie was a model throughout the 1980s. Her break in television came in 1989 when she auditioned for the role of hostess on Wheel of Fortune After leaving the show in 1994, Smillie appeared on the BBC television channel, firstly as a reporter on The Travel Show, and then the Holiday show, eventually becoming the programme's main presenter. The DIY programme Changing Rooms established her name and led to her presenting other primetime shows for the BBC, such as the National Lottery and her own morning chat show Smillie's People.

In 2012 Smillie decided to leave mainstream TV and created a new business venture, launching a brand of leak-proof underwear for women, named DiaryDoll. This was later changed to Pretty Clever Pants. In 2018 Smillie relinquished control of her business, licensing the brand to the company High Street TV.

As of 2018, Smillie qualified as a humanist celebrant with the Humanist Society Scotland, and is now pursuing a career conducting humanist, non-religious weddings, funerals and baby-namings.

1961–1988: Early life and career beginnings
Smillie was born on 23 December 1961, in Glasgow, Scotland, the daughter of Isobel and electrical engineer George Smillie. She has two older sisters and one older brother. 

Smillie attended Simshill Primary School and  the independent Hutchesons' Grammar School. Academically she attained seven O-grades, including a qualification in fabric and fashion. She left the following year with three Highers, but needed five to get into the Glasgow School of Art. Smillie studied at Langside College, but managed only one more, which she has attributed to too much freedom and enjoying herself. Undeterred, she spent another year at Cardonald College, finally achieving this goal.

At age 18, in 1979, Smillie embarked on her first year at the Glasgow School of Art, studying Art, Design, and Fashion, with the idea of becoming a fashion designer, but felt she didn't really fit in with the typical punk students sporting green hair and pink shoes. To subsidise her studies, Smillie worked in a cocktail bar, modelling part-time, and eventually left to embark on a modelling career.

Smillie then joined the Best Modelling Agency, run by Fiona Best. Smillie worked for the agency throughout the 1980s. Smillie met her future husband, former model Alex Knight, through Fiona's agency.

Life and career

1989–present: Television career

1989–1994: Wheel of Fortune
Smillie's presenting career launched in 1989, at age 27, when she beat 5,000 other applicants to become the hostess and puzzle board operator of Scottish Television's Wheel of Fortune game show. She co-presented the show until 1994 with Nicky Campbell.

1994–1996: Get It On
Fashion series  presented by Smillie and produced by Scottish Television.

1992–1993: The Travel Show
Reporter on BBC Two's The Travel Show.

1995–1996: Hearts of Gold
Smillie joined the show as co-presenter with Mickey Hutton, alongside the main presenter Esther Rantzen. The show recognised unsung heroes and heroines who had shown outstanding bravery and dedication to public life.

1996–2000: Holiday
Stints followed on BBC One for the Holiday programme. Smillie continued to present holiday programmes such as Summer Holiday, Holiday Swaps, Holiday Heaven and Holiday Favourites throughout the 1990s.

1996–2003: Changing Rooms
In 1996, Smillie became the original presenter of BBC Two's new DIY show Changing Rooms. The show was an immediate success and was transferred to BBC One for series 2. The programme is credited with starting a craze for DIY in the late 1990s. During her time on the show, it won a National TV Award and an INDIE Award and were BAFTA nominated. Smillie remained the main presenter for 13 series, leaving in 2003. In September 1998, she was the subject of This Is Your Life.

1996–2000: The National Lottery Show
In 1996, Smillie was selected as a presenter of the BBC The National Lottery Show. She mainly appeared on the Wednesday Midweek Draw show, but also made occasional appearances on Saturday nights. Smillie presented various incarnations of the show between 1996 and 2000. In September 2006, she appeared on The National Lottery: Everyone's A Winner! in Edinburgh.

1996–1997: Smillie's People
In 1998, Smillie hosted a short mid-morning celebrity chat-show on BBC One entitled Smillie's People.

2003–2005: Dream Holiday Homes
In 2003, after leaving Changing Rooms, Smillie joined the Channel 5 show Dream Holiday Homes. This new show was similar to Changing Rooms, although this time, entire properties were given a makeover. The properties were situated in various Southern European locations, and at the end of each show Smillie would sell off the property for the price of a £1 phone call to a lucky viewer picked at random. The show ran for five series.

2004: Strictly Ice Dancing
In 2004, Smillie was one of the celebrities to take part in Strictly Ice Dancing, a one-off ice dance version of Strictly Come Dancing.

2005: The People's Court
Smillie was back working for STV Productions in 2005 as presenter of the short-lived ITV  show The People's Court.

2005: A Brush with Fame
Later that year, she was the presenter of  ITV's A Brush with Fame, searching for the UK's best amateur portrait artist.

2006: Strictly Come Dancing
From October to December 2006, Smillie took part in Series Four of Strictly Come Dancing with dance partner Matthew Cutler. She improved as the series progressed. Len Goodman often referred to her as the Dark Horse of the competition, and played music from the Black Beauty TV series over her training clips on the complementary show Strictly Come Dancing: It Takes Two.
She came fifth out of the fourteen competitors.

2007–2008: Postcode Challenge
Smillie returned to STV from November 2007 into 2008 to host the Scottish channel's new gameshow, Postcode Challenge. In each show, four teams of six people from the same postcode area are tested on general knowledge.

2009: Best of British Wedding Venues
On 22 September 2009, Smillie presented a 10 part  series entitled Best of British Wedding Venues on Wedding TV, a woman's lifestyle channel on the Sky and Freesat platforms.

2013–2014: Finding Scotland's Real Heroes
Smillie presented the 2013 and 2014 series of STV's Finding Scotland's Real Heroes.

Television guest appearances
In 1993, she appeared on the Saturday evening BBC One light entertainment show Noel's House Party, when her "Gotcha" tape was shown to viewers.

In 2001, Smillie appeared on Lily Savage's Blankety Blank and the following year appeared on The Sooty Show in the episode called "All New Sooty".

In the summer of 2009, Smillie appeared as a guest presenter of STV's The Hour for one week, with main anchor Stephen Jardine.

In 2004, she took part in a television documentary called Gender Swap for  Channel 5. Using silicon prosthetic makeup, she was transformed from female to male and was  then given the challenge of attending a speed dating event as her new opposite sex self.

Outside television

1982–2010: Model
In her early years, Smillie worked the exhibition circuit and was an occasional lingerie model. Smillie was allegedly one of the Tennent's Lager girls (a Scottish marketing promotion that put pictures of young women on the backs of cans of lager). Smillie denied a role in The Independent newspaper on 2 October 2006.

Smillie has continued to model occasionally since her rise to fame. Between 2007 and 2010 Smillie was the figurehead model for the Scottish company The Edinburgh Woollen Mill.

1994 and 2009: Radio
In 1994, Smillie presented a holiday show for BBC Radio 5 Live called Carol Smillie's Blue Skies, featuring reports from various worldwide destinations and holiday tips for would be travellers.

In June 2009, Smillie appeared in the BBC Radio Scotland comedy sketch show Ellis and Clarke. Smillie appeared in a number of sketches in the 30-minute production playing herself, in which she and the members of the cast parodied her television personality. The show was broadcast on BBC Radio Scotland on 5 June 2009.

On Bank Holiday 31 August 2009, Smillie hosted her own Radio show on 105.2 Smooth Radio, a Scottish Independent Local Radio station broadcasting to Glasgow and the surrounding area.

2003: Author
In 2003, Smillie joined forces with Eileen Fursland to become a best selling author with the publication of Carol Smillie's Working Mum's Handbook. The book examined the practical problems and emotional issues that face women who go back to work. It considered work-life balance, time management, workplace rights to maternity leave and pay, tax credits.

Starting on 10 May 2008, Smillie co-wrote – with animal behaviourist Emma Magson – a weekly column in The Times entitled 'Perfect Pets'. The column was featured in the Body and Soul section of the Saturday edition and lasted 10 weeks.

2006–2011: Actress

2006–2007 and 2010–2011: Stage actress

In February 2006, Smillie made her début on the stage in the Eve Ensler play The Vagina Monologues. She completed three tours of Scotland, appearing in Aberdeen, Ayr, Dundee, Edinburgh, Glasgow and Perth.

In February to March 2010, Smillie appeared on stage in Hormonal Housewives, a new comedy written by Julie Coombe and John MacIsaac. Appearing alongside Smillie were the co-writer Julie Coombe and Shonagh Price. The comedy portrayed  three women juggling a career, childcare and  being a housewife. The play begins with the three women getting ready for a night out and then moves into a series of self-contained sketches. The finale features a medley of music by Kylie Minogue, Madonna and Cher. Smillie takes the part of Madonna, dancing and miming to the track "Holiday", dressed in a pastiche outfit based on the Jean Paul Gaultier-designed conical bra corset, from the singer's 1990 Blond Ambition tour. Smillie took the play on a three-week tour of Scotland performing at theatres in Aberdeen, Dundee, Edinburgh, Glasgow and Inverness.

2008: Film Actress
In 2008, Smillie made her film debut in a short film entitled Infamy playing a television presenter named Joan. The story concerns a man who is so desperate to get on Reality TV that he will try anything, including ultimately, holding up a shop at gunpoint to make the local news.

2012–2018: Entrepreneur

2012–2018: DiaryDoll/Pretty Clever Pants
In October 2012, Smillie started her own business, DiaryDoll, with business partner and friend Annabel Croft, an ex-international tennis player. Together they created a range of women's underwear specifically for use during periods, with a secret waterproof panel inside them to remove the possibility of leaks and stains on clothing and bedding. They were designed to look and feel like normal underwear – i.e. breathable, washable and not crackly – giving women the confidence to go about their usual activities. DiaryDoll then partnered with charity Endometriosis UK, giving confidence to some of the 1.5 million British women who suffer painful and heavy periods as a result of endometriosis. It was later noted that these were also useful to women in post-maternity and with pelvic floor weakness and the company was rebranded to include all of these groups.

An additional goal for Smillie is to reduce the stigma of periods and women's pelvic health as it is still seen to be an embarrassing topic despite its prevalence and normality amongst healthy women.

2018–present: Humanist celebrant
Smillie is a humanist. In 2018, she became an accredited humanist celebrant with the Humanist Society Scotland, conducting humanist, non-religious weddings, funerals and baby-namings.

Personal life
Smillie lives in Glasgow with husband Alex Knight, a restaurateur, whom she married in August 1991. They have three children. 

Smillie's smile was caricatured by the British impressionist Ronni Ancona in the UK television show Big Impression. Ancona's impression of Smillie used the catchphrase "I'm Smiley Smiley Carol Smillie".

Charity work
Smillie is involved with several charities, primarily ones concerned with child welfare. One of her main charities is The Prince & Princess of Wales Hospice (PPWH). She hosts 'A Little Less Strictly Come Dancing' Ball for them every year alongside Angus Purden. Smillie was a contestant on the British television game show Who Wants to Be a Millionaire? supporting the charity NSPCC. She appeared on the show with Michael Aspel. They failed to progress past the £16,000 mark when they missed the question about authors, dropping to £1,000.

Trustee 
Smillie is trustee to a number of Glasgow institutions. These include Kelvingrove Art Gallery and Museum, where she is on the board as trustee of The Kelvingrove Refurbishment Appeal (KRA). This is an independent trust established to raise £5 million in sponsorship and donations towards the £27.9million refurbishment of Kelvingrove. She became a board member and Trustee for The Riverside Museum.

She supports the Glasgow School of Art, as a former and current student of the School’s Continuing Education Programme. Smillie is a member of the Mackintosh Conservation and Access Project team. In July 2007 she launched The Digital MacIntosh Project to raise funds for the restoration and refurbishment of the MacIntosh Building, which houses the school.

Mensa
When Smillie was hosting Wheel of Fortune in the early 1991s, she was invited to take the Mensa test for high IQs by a tabloid newspaper, to prove that game show hostesses were not stupid. She said she had passed with an IQ of 148. She courted controversy in 2003, when she announced in an interview that she had cheated on the test. She admitted that the test was not taken under exam conditions, and she completed only two thirds of it, coming unstuck at the end. Smillie had phoned a friend to complete the remainder of the test. She said, "I felt slightly guilty at the time, but it hadn't really bothered me that I had cheated because it was never a real test to me, and Mensa had never invited me to take part."

Filmography

Television
Presenter

Wheel of Fortune 1989–1994
The Travel Show 1992
Holiday 1994–2001
including
Summer Holiday, Holiday Swaps, Holiday Heaven and Holiday Favourites
Hearts of Gold 1995 – 1996
Get It On 1996
Changing Rooms 1996–2003
The National Lottery 1996–2000
including
The National Lottery – Amazing Luck Stories,
The National Lottery – We've Got Your Number,
National Lottery – Local Heroes
Smillie's People 1996–97
Crazy For Love 1996
Edinburgh Hogmanay Live 1996
Edinburgh Hogmanay Live 1997
New Year Live Hogmanay Show 1998
Star Secrets 1999
Surprising Stars 2001
Dream Holiday Homes 2003–2005
Baby Hospital Live 2004
The Peoples Court 2005
A Brush With Fame 2005
Yorkhill 2005–2006 (Narrator)
Postcode Challenge 2007–2008
The Hour 2009
Best of British Wedding Venues 2009
Scotland's Winter Wonderland 2010 (Narrator)
3@Three 2010
The Hour 2010
Vet School 2011 (Narrator)

Guest appearances

The Hypnotic World of Paul McKenna 1994
You Bet 1995 1996 1997
The Alphabet Game 1996
Shooting Stars 1996
An Evening with Lily Savage 1996
Confessions 1998
Clive Anderson All Talk 1998
McCoist & MacAulay 1998
Celebrity Ready Steady Cook 1999
All Over The Shop 1999
It's Only TV...But I Like It 1999
Blankety Blank 1999
Clarkson 1999
This Is Your Life 1999
Heaven And Earth Show 2001
Celebrity Friends Like These 2001
Sooty 2001
Hot Potatoes 2002
Friday Night with Jonathon Ross 2002
The Brian Conley Show 2002
Alter Ego 2002
Kelly 2003 and 2005
V Graham Norton 2003
Have I Got News for You 2003
Today with Des and Mel 2003 2004
Ant & Dec's Saturday Night Takeaway 2004
Win, Lose or Draw Late 2004
29 Minutes of Fame 2005
The Paul O'Grady Show 2005
Stars in Fast Cars 2005
Brainiac: Science Abuse 2005
The Prince's Trust 30th Birthday: Live 2006
Strictly Come Dancing: It Takes Two 2006
Your Country Needs You 2007
The Aphrodisiac Test 2007
The Meaning Of Life 2007
Tonight With Trevor McDonald 2007
The Pyramid Game 2007
The Grumpy Guide To 2007
Hider in the House 2008
The Alan Titchmarsh Show 2008
Take It Or Leave It 2008
How TV Changed Britain – Property 2008
Daily Cooks Challenge 2008
What Are You Like ? 2008
STV's Top 30 Best Loved Shows (Part 5) 2009
Loose Women 2009
All Star Mr & Mrs 2010
The One Show (Children in Need Reporter) 2010
Coronation Street:The Big 50 2010
Countdown 2011
Pointless Celebrities 2013
Pointless Celebrities 2019

Reality TV Appearances

Gender Swap 2004
Strictly Ice Dancing 2004
Star Spell 2005
Strictly Come Dancing 2006
Strictly Come Dancing: It Takes Two 2006
Kitchen Burnout 2010

Actress

2point4 Children 1999
Brookside 2000
Infamy 2008

Radio
Ellis and Clarke 2009

Videos
Changing Shape with Carol Smillie (2000)
Changing Rooms – Trust Me..I'm A Designer (2002)

Books
Carol Smillie's Working Mums Handbook (2003)

Awards
 National Television Award for Changing Rooms
 INDIE Award for Changing Rooms
 Bafta Nominated for Changing Rooms
 Rear of the Year 1998, a British award for people with a notable posterior.
In October 2008, Carol was nominated for a Scottish BAFTA, in The Lloyds TSB Scotland Audience Award for Most Popular Scottish Presenter category.

References

External links
Official website

Mass media people from Glasgow
Scottish female models
Scottish atheists
Scottish humanists
Scottish non-fiction writers
Scottish television presenters
Scottish women television presenters
1961 births
Living people
People educated at Hutchesons' Grammar School